Little Bromwich is a small area in central-east Birmingham, England. It borders with Bordesley Green and Small Heath and there is a road named after it. It is also quite close to Yardley, and often confused with part of Bordesley Green.

The Little Bromwich Centre is on Hob Moore Road. The area covered is from Hob Moore Road to Little Bromwich Road.

The area is part of the Birmingham Hodge Hill parliamentary constituency; it is in the Bordesley Green and Heartlands council wards.

Following the 2021 United Kingdom census, it was reported in 2022 that Little Bromwich had the smallest share of adults identifying as gay, lesbian or bisexual in England and Wales.

References 

Areas of Birmingham, West Midlands